Coast Guard Station Tillamook Bay is an active duty installation of the United States Coast Guard located in Garibaldi, Oregon, as well as a nationally recognized historic site. A station has been operating in Tillamook Bay since 1908. The station was opened by the United States Life-saving Service a precursor agency to the Coast Guard. The current station has been in continuous operation since 1942.

In 1909 station crew rescued the complement of the coastal steamer Argo.

Over the July 4th weekend of 1980 Richard Dixon, the coxswain of a 44-foot Motor Lifeboat from the station was awarded the unusual honor of two Coast Guard Medals, for leading two daring rescues.

The station was entered onto the National Register of Historic Places in 1993.

See also
National Register of Historic Places listings in Tillamook County, Oregon

References

Buildings and structures in Tillamook County, Oregon
Colonial Revival architecture in Oregon
Government buildings completed in 1943
Military facilities on the National Register of Historic Places in Oregon
United States Coast Guard stations
National Register of Historic Places in Tillamook County, Oregon
1908 establishments in Oregon